Gerhard Rochus "Gerd" Dudek (28 September 1938 – 3 November 2022) was a German jazz tenor and soprano saxophonist, clarinetist and flautist.

Dudek studied clarinet privately and attended music school in the 1950s, before joining a big band led by his brother Ossi until 1958. During the early 1960s, Dudek played in the Berliner Jazz Quintet, in Karl Blume's group and in Kurt Edelhagen's orchestra until 1965. He then became interested in free music and joined Manfred Schoof's quintet. Dudek took part in the first sessions of The Globe Unity Orchestra in 1966, and played with them at various times into the 1980s. He also worked with many other European free musicians and composers, including Alexander von Schlippenbach, Loek Dikker and The Waterland Ensemble And European Jazz Quintet.

Dudek was best known for his work with Manfred Schoof, Wolfgang Dauner, Lala Kovacev, the Globe Unity Orchestra, Berlin Contemporary Jazz Orchestra, Albert Mangelsdorff, Don Cherry and George Russell.

Dudek died on 3 November 2022, at the age of 84.

References

External links
 Dudeks FMP releases
 
 

1938 births
2022 deaths
German jazz flautists
German jazz saxophonists
Male saxophonists
German jazz clarinetists
21st-century saxophonists
21st-century clarinetists
21st-century German male musicians
German male jazz musicians
Berlin Contemporary Jazz Orchestra members
Globe Unity Orchestra members
European Jazz Ensemble members
21st-century flautists